Joseph Aldrich Bermingham (1801–19 May 1874) was an eminent Irish Anglican priest.

He was educated at Trinity College Dublin  and held incumbencies at St Bride's, Dublin and Kellistown. He was the Dean of Kilmacduagh from 1849 until his death aged 73 at 
Gort on 19 May 1874.

Notes

Alumni of Trinity College Dublin
Deans of Kilmacduagh
1801 births
1874 deaths